The 2013–14 figure skating season began on July 1, 2013, and ended on June 30, 2014. During this season, elite skaters competed at the Olympic level in the 2014 Winter Olympics and at the ISU Championship level in the 2014 European, Four Continents, World Junior, and World Championships. They also competed in elite events such as the Grand Prix series and Junior Grand Prix series, culminating in the Grand Prix Final.

Season notes

Age eligibility 
Skaters competing at the junior level were required to be at least 13 years old, but not yet 19 (or 21 for male pair skaters and ice dancers), before July 1, 2013. Those who turned 14 before the given date were eligible for the senior Grand Prix series and senior B internationals; those who turned 15 before that date were also eligible for the Olympics, senior World, European, and Four Continents Championships.

Minimum scores

Grand Prix 
In order to compete in the Grand Prix series, skaters are required to reach a minimum total score at an accepted ISU event.

ISU Championships 
To be eligible to compete at the European, Four Continents, Junior World, or World Championships, skaters are required to achieve the following scores in a prior ISU-recognized event.

Partnership changes 
Some skaters announced the dissolution of a partnership or formation of a new one. Listed are changes involving at least one partner who competed at Worlds, Europeans, Four Continents, Junior Worlds or the senior Grand Prix, or who medaled on the Junior Grand Prix circuit. The ISU does not permit teams to compete for two countries—if skaters of different nationalities team up, they must choose one country to represent.

Coaching changes

Retirements

Competitions 
Key

International medalists

Men

Ladies

Pairs

Ice dance

Season's best scores

Men

Ladies

Pairs

Ice dance

Standings and ranking

Season-end standings (top 30)

Men's singles

Ladies' singles

Pairs

Ice dance

Season's ranking (top 30)

Men's singles

Ladies' singles

Pairs

Ice dance

References

External links 
 International Skating Union

Seasons in figure skating
2013 in figure skating
2014 in figure skating